The Oceanian section of the 2022 FIFA World Cup qualification acted as qualifiers for the 2022 FIFA World Cup, to be held in Qatar, for national teams which are members of the Oceania Football Confederation (OFC). A total of 0.5 slots in the final tournament were available for OFC teams, which equated to one inter-confederation play-off slot.

Due to the COVID-19 pandemic in Oceania, the qualification was held as a centralised tournament in Qatar from 17 to 30 March 2022.

Format
In November 2021, the OFC confirmed the format for the qualifiers in response to the COVID-19 pandemic. The qualifying stage was to be a single match on 13 March 2022 between the two lowest-ranked participating OFC nations in the FIFA World Rankings, with the winner advancing to the group stage, but Tonga withdrew from the qualification match causing Cook Islands to automatically enter the group stage. Then eight remaining teams were drawn into two groups of four, playing single leg round-robin. The top two teams from each group advanced to a single leg knockout stage. The final winner advanced to the inter-confederation play-offs.

Entrants
On 28 July 2020, the OFC confirmed that the qualifications would involve all eleven OFC teams. On 29 November 2021, the date of the group stage draw, FIFA reported that nine of the eleven FIFA-affiliated national teams from the OFC would enter qualification, as American Samoa and Samoa had withdrawn. On 29 January 2022, two months after the group stage draw but two months before the competition was to begin, Tonga also withdrew due to the 2022 Hunga Tonga–Hunga Ha'apai eruption and tsunami. On 19 March 2022, Vanuatu withdrew after the tournament had started due to the majority of players testing positive for COVID-19. On 23 March 2022, Cook Islands also withdrew after the tournament had started due to players testing positive for COVID-19.

W Withdrew after one match

Schedule
Qualifying was initially expected to begin in September 2020, but many international matches scheduled for the FIFA window in that month were cancelled in June 2020 due to the COVID-19 pandemic, while the inter-confederation play-offs were also moved from March to June 2022.

In November 2020, the OFC announced a further delay in the qualifying process until June 2021.

In March 2021, the confederation announced that this timeframe would not be achievable either, outlining a potential option organise a competition in January 2022, keeping the FIFA International Match Calendar dates in March available for preparation matches ahead of the inter-confederation play-off in June. Fiji and New Caledonia were proposed as possible venues.

By September 2021, continued delays meant that the OFC felt it was "not possible at this time to organise a qualifying competition within the Oceania region" and, as an alternative, they requested FIFA's approval for the qualification to be held in Qatar in March 2022. This was confirmed by FIFA on 29 November 2021.

Venues
The matches are played at two venues in the city of Doha.

Qualification match
A qualification match was due to be held between the two lowest-ranked teams (Tonga and the Cook Islands) to determine the eighth team to compete in the group stage. The match was cancelled after Tonga withdrew due to the effects of the 2022 Hunga Tonga–Hunga Ha'apai eruption and tsunami; the Cook Islands advanced to the group stage.

Summary

Match

Group stage
The seven highest ranking OFC teams which entered the competition were given a bye to the group stage alongside the winner of the qualification match. The teams were divided into two groups, each containing four teams. Each team played every other team in their group once in a round-robin format, and the winners and runners-up of each group advanced to the semi-finals.

Draw
The group stage draw was held in Zürich, Switzerland on 29 November 2021, 21:00 CET (30 November, 09:00 NZDT). The identity of the qualification match winner was not known at the time of the draw. The draw began with pot 2 and finished with pot 1, with teams being allocated to the groups sequentially (firstly A, then B). The first two teams drawn were assigned to position 4, while the next two were assigned to position 3, and the first two from pot 1 to position 2. The two highest ranked teams, New Zealand and the Solomon Islands, were assigned to positions A1 and B1, and were therefore not drawn in the same group.

The draw resulted in the following groups:

The fixtures for the group stage were decided based on the draw results, as follows:

Group A

Group B

Final stage
In the single-leg matches of the final stage, if a match was level at the end of normal playing time, extra time was played (two periods of 15 minutes each) to decide the winner. If still tied after extra time, the match was decided by a penalty shoot-out.

Bracket

New Zealand defeated Solomon Islands 5–0 and advanced to the OFC-CONCACAF play-off

Semi-finals

Final
The final winner advanced to the inter-confederation play-off.

Inter-confederation play-off

The inter-confederation play-off was determined by a draw held on 26 November 2021. The winner from OFC was drawn against the fourth-placed team from CONCACAF third round. The play-off was played as a single match in Qatar on 14 June 2022.

Goalscorers

Notes

References

External links

Qualifiers – Oceania, FIFA.com
FIFA World Cup Qatar 2022 Qualifiers, at Oceania Football Confederation

Ofc
FIFA World Cup qualification (OFC)
2021–22 in OFC football
FIFA
FIFA World Cup Qualification OFC, 2022
International association football competitions hosted by Qatar
FIFA
21st century in Doha
Sports competitions in Doha